Premium is a 2006 romantic comedy-drama film written and directed by Pete Chatmon, and starring Dorian Missick, Zoe Saldaña, and Hill Harper.

Cast
 Dorian Missick as Cool
 Zoe Saldana as Charli
 Hill Harper as Ed
 Eva Pigford as Farrah
 Tonya Pinkins as Marva
 Sean Nelson as Austin Price
 Novella Nelson as Jayme
 Keith Nobbs as Derick
 Frankie Faison as Phil
 William Sadler as Cole Carter

Accolades
 2006 Miami International Film Festival, World Cinema Competition
 2006 UrbanWorld Vibe Film Festival, Honorable Mention Audience Award
 2006 Bahamas International Film Festival, New Visions Award, Special Jury Prize
 2006 BMW Blackfilm.com Film Series (Los Angeles, Chicago, Washington DC, Atlanta)
 2006 American Black Film Festival, Official Selection
 2006 Pan African Film Festival, Closing Night Film, Atlanta, Georgia
 2006 Newark Black Film Festival, Official Selection
 2006 Black Harvest Film Festival, Official Selection

External links
  
 
 
 

2006 films
2006 romantic comedy-drama films
African-American films
American romantic comedy-drama films
American independent films
2006 independent films
2006 comedy films
2006 drama films
2000s English-language films
2000s American films